Kandalat (also Romanized as Kandalāt and Kandelāt; also known as Gandelāt, Kandah Lat, and Kandeh Lāt) is a village in Blukat Rural District, Rahmatabad and Blukat District, Rudbar County, Gilan Province, Iran. At the 2006 census, its population was 347, in 86 families.

References 

Populated places in Rudbar County